Koślinka may refer to the following places:
Koślinka, Kuyavian-Pomeranian Voivodeship (north-central Poland)
Koślinka, Chojnice County in Pomeranian Voivodeship (north Poland)
Koślinka, Pomeranian Voivodeship (north Poland)